{{DISPLAYTITLE:C12H13N3}}
The molecular formula C12H13N3 (molar mass: 199.25 g/mol, exact mass: 199.1109 u) may refer to:

 Dipicolylamine
 Gapicomine
 Pyrimethanil